Sexual Offences Act (with its variations) is a stock short title used for legislation in the United Kingdom and former British colonies and territories such as Antigua and Barbuda, Crown dependencies, Kenya, Lesotho, Republic of Ireland, Sierra Leone, South Africa and Trinidad and Tobago relating to sexual offences (including both substantive and procedural provisions).

The Bill for an Act with this short title may have been known as a Sexual Offences Bill during its passage through Parliament.

Sexual Offences Acts may be a generic name for legislation bearing that short title. It is a term of art.

List

United Kingdom

England and Wales
The Sexual Offences Act 1956 (4 & 5 Eliz.2 c.69)
The Indecency with Children Act 1960 (8 & 9 Eliz.2 c.33)
The Sexual Offences Act 1967 (c.60)
The Sexual Offences (Amendment) Act 1976 (c.82)
The Sexual Offences Act 1985 (c.44)
The Sexual Offences (Amendment) Act 1992 (c.34)
The Sexual Offences Act 1993 (c.30)
The Sexual Offences (Conspiracy and Incitement) Act 1996 (c.29)
The Sexual Offences (Protected Material) Act 1997 (c.39)
The Sexual Offences (Amendment) Act 2000 (c.44)
The Sexual Offences Act 2003 (c.42)

The Sexual Offences Acts

The Sexual Offences Acts 1956 and 1967 is the collective title of the Sexual Offences Act 1957 and the Sexual Offences Act 1967.
The Sexual Offences Acts 1956 to 1976 is the collective title of the Sexual Offences Acts 1956 and 1967 and the Sexual Offences (Amendment) Act 1976.
The Sexual Offences Acts 1956 to 1992 is the collective title of the Sexual Offences Acts 1956 to 1976 and the Sexual Offences (Amendment) Act 1992.

Scotland
The Sexual Offences (Scotland) Act 1976 (c.67)
The Sexual Offences (Procedure and Evidence) (Scotland) Act 2002 (asp 9)
The Protection of Children and Prevention of Sexual Offences (Scotland) Act 2005 (asp 9)
The Sexual Offences (Scotland) Act 2009 (asp 9)

Northern Ireland
A number of Orders in Council with this title have been passed. The change in nomenclature is due to the demise of the Parliament of Northern Ireland and the imposition of direct rule. These orders are considered to be primary legislation.
The Sexual Offences (Northern Ireland) Order 1978 (S.I.1978/460 (N.I.5))
The Sexual Offences (Northern Ireland) Order 2008 (S.I.2008/1769 (N.I.2))

Antigua and Barbuda
 The Sexual Offences Act 1995

Barbados
 Sexual Offences Act 1993
 Sexual Offences (Amendment) Act 2016

Crown dependencies

Bailiwick of Guernsey
 Sexual Offences (Bailiwick of Guernsey) Law, 1983
 The Sexual Offences (Amendment) (Guernsey) Law, 2000
 The Sexual Offences (Bailiwick of Guernsey) (Amendment) Law, 2011

Bailiwick of Jersey
 Sex Offenders (Jersey) Law 1990
 Sex Offenders (Jersey) Law 2007
 Sex Offenders (Jersey) Law 2010

Isle of Man
 Sexual Offences Act 1992
 Sexual Offences (Amendment) Act 2006

Dominica
 Sexual Offences Act 1887
 Sexual Offences (Amendment) Act 1992
 Sexual Offences Act 1996
 Sexual Offences (Amendment) Act 2016

Guyana
 Sexual Offences Act 2010

Jamaica
 Sexual Offences Act 2009

Kenya
The Sexual Offences Act 2006

Republic of Ireland
 Criminal Law (Sexual Offences) Act, 1993
 Sexual Offences (Jurisdiction) Act, 1996
 Sex Offenders Act, 2001
 Criminal Law (Sexual Offences) Act 2006
 Criminal Law (Sexual Offences) Act 2017

Lesotho
 Sexual Offences Act 2003

Maldives
 Sexual Offences Act 2014

Sierra Leone
 Sexual Offences Act 2012

South Africa
The Sexual Offences Act, 1957 (now mostly repealed)
The Criminal Law (Sexual Offences and Related Matters) Amendment Act, 2007

Tanzania
 Sexual Offences (Special Provisions) Act 1998

Trinidad and Tobago
 Sexual Offences Act, 1986
 Sexual Offences (Amendment) Act, 2000

See also
Sexual offences in the United Kingdom
List of short titles

References

Lists of legislation by short title
English criminal law
Sex crimes in the United Kingdom
Prostitution law in the United Kingdom
Prostitution in South Africa
Prostitution in Kenya
Prostitution in Trinidad and Tobago
Prostitution in Sierra Leone
Prostitution law